Leonardo Andam (August 15, 1958 – May 22, 2014) was a Filipino professional pool player. Andam was a multiple time winner at the Southeast Asian Games. He was part of the Filipino snooker national team alongside Joven Alba and Ronnie Alcano. Andam reached the Quarter finals of the 2001 WPA World Nine-ball Championship, before losing 9–11 to Canadian Alain Martel.

Death
Andam died in 2014, aged 55 from a motorcycle accident. Andam was travelling to Ozamiz for a tournament, but fell from his cycle in Iligan.

Titles
 2008 Fifth Annual One Pocket Shoot Out
 2005 Southeast Asian Games Rotation Doubles
 2005 Southeast Asian Games Snooker Team
 2000 International 9-Ball Championship
 2003 Falcon Cue 9-Ball Tour Open Division
 1995 Dallas Open 9-Ball
 1993 PBT Riviera Team Championship 
 1993 PBT Riviera Target Pool Championship
 1991 Southeast Asian Games Nine-ball Team
 1991 Southeast Asian Games Rotation Singles

References

Filipino pool players
2014 deaths
Southeast Asian Games medalists in cue sports
1958 births
Cue sports players at the 2006 Asian Games